Mario Andres Rodriguez Jr. (born May 12, 1994) is an American soccer player.

Club career
Rodriguez was born in North Hollywood, California. He came up through the LA Galaxy academy before joining the United States U17 residential academy. He later signed with Borussia Mönchengladbach, although he failed to make any first-team appearances, playing exclusively with Borussia Mönchengladbach II. He later signed with Dynamo Dresden before being loaned to Chemnitzer FC. On 3 January it was confirmed, that Rodriguez once more was loaned out, this time to Sonnenhof Großaspach.

International career
Rodriguez was born in the United States and is of Mexican descent. Rodriguez has represented the United States at multiple youth levels.

Honors
United States U17
CONCACAF U-17 Championship: 2011

References

External links

1994 births
Living people
American soccer players
United States men's youth international soccer players
United States men's under-23 international soccer players
American sportspeople of Mexican descent
3. Liga players
People from North Hollywood, Los Angeles
Soccer players from Los Angeles
Association football forwards
United States men's under-20 international soccer players
Borussia Mönchengladbach II players
Chemnitzer FC players
SG Sonnenhof Großaspach players